Samy Seghir (born 29 June 1994) is a French actor of Algerian descent.

Biography 
From an Algerian family, Samy began his career in 2006, when his mother replied to an advertisement in a local newspaper, Aubermensuel. He participated in the audition for 
Michou d'Auber and was noticed by producer Luc Besson. Living in Émile-Dubois, like the character he was playing, Messaoud, Samy starred in this historic film alongside Gérard Depardieu and Nathalie Baye.

In 2006, he starred in a TV movie, Harkis, notably with Smaïn. In 2007, he also starred in Big City, a film by Djamel Bensalah.

In 2009, he won the lead role in Neuilly sa mère !, which was the result of his previous collaboration with Djamel Bensalah, the producer.  Samy Seghir presented an award at the NRJ Music Awards on 23 January 2010, alongside Maxime Godart and Victoria Silvstedt.

He was part of the last fifteen contenders for a César Award, for the Most Promising Newcomer. In the end, he was not on the list of the final five nominees.

In the spring of 2010, he starred in Alain Tasma's TV movie Fracture, inspired by the book Ils sont votre épouvante et vous êtes leur crainte by Thierry Jonquet, with Leïla Bekhti and Anaïs Demoustier.

On 28 May 2011, he made an appearance in the clip 'L'insécurité' by French rapper, Seyfu.

Nine years later, Samy Seghir again has the main role of Neuilly sa mère, sa mère.

Film 

2006 : Bonne nuit Malik: Bilal
2007 : Michou d'Auber: Messaoud / Michou
2007 : Big City: Wapiti
2009 : Neuilly sa mère !: Sami Benboudaoud
2009 : Des livres et moi: Samy
2011 : Beur sur la ville: Trainee policeman Samy
2011 : Nuit Blanche: Thomas
2011 : Un temps d'avance: Samy
2013 : The Dream Kids: Selim 
2013 : Turning Tide: Mano Ixa
2018 : Neuilly sa mère, sa mère! : Sami Benboudaoud
2020 : Earth and Blood : Yanis

Television 

2006 : Harkis: Kader
2009 : Les Bleus, premiers pas dans la police (Season 2, Episode 1): Abdel
2010 : Fracture : Lakhdar

References

External links

 

1994 births
French people of Algerian descent
Living people
21st-century French male actors
French male film actors
French male television actors